is a Japanese kickboxer who competes in the lightweight and welterweight divisions. He began practicing karate as a young boy and had great success in both full contact karate and amateur kickboxing in his early teens, which included winning the K-1 Koshien 62 kg (136 lb) schoolboys tournament in 2009. After turning professional in 2010, he became a mainstay in the Krush promotion and was victorious in the 2011 Krush Under-22 ~63 kg (140 lb) Supernova~ Tournament.

Noiri is known for his devastating knee strikes. As of February 2021, he is ranked the #3 super featherweight in the world by Combat Press.

Career

Early life
Masaaki Noiri began kickboxing at a young age because of bullying in school.

Amateur career
As a schoolboy, Noiri began practicing Shin Karate, a style of full contact karate based on Kyokushin but modified to use boxing gloves and allow punches to the face. He soon became an All Japan Junior Champion in the discipline. On February 25, 2007 at the age of thirteen, Noiri participated in a try-out held by the K-1 kickboxing organization and was taken on as one of Japan's youngest prospects.

Noiri continued to show promise by winning the New Japan Karate Federation's K-2 Lightweight Grand Prix on May 3, 2009. He was then called upon to fight under the K-1 banner on August 10, 2009 at the K-1 Koshien 2009 King of Under 18 Final 16, where he defeated Ryo Murakoshi via knee strike knockout at the opening stage of the K-1 Koshien −62 kg/136 lb high school tournament. Advancing to the quarter-finals at the K-1 World MAX 2009 World Championship Tournament Final on November 26, 2009, Noiri beat Keisuke Miyamoto by unanimous decision.

The final two stages of the tournament were held on December 31, 2009 at Dynamite!! 2009. Noiri was drawn against the previous year's Koshien champion, Hiroya, in the semi-finals and caused an upset by winning a unanimous decision from the judges. He then took another unanimous nod over Shota Shimada in the final to become the K-1 Koshien 2009 King of Under 18 Tournament Champion.

He returned to K-1 Koshien the following year, with all four tournament rounds being held on the same night at the K-1 Koshien 2010 King of Under 18 Final on November 20, 2010. He made it past Naoki Takeda with a unanimous decision victory in the first round, but was then eliminated by Keigo Ishida via decision at the quarter-finals.

Professional career
Noiri debuted as a professional kickboxer on March 14, 2010 in his home town of Nagoya, defeating Shinji Aseishi by unanimous decision. Following this, he was recruited by Krush and went 3–0 in the promotion, including two KO wins, before entering the Krush First Generation King Tournament at −60 kg/132 lb which began on December 12, 2010. He was victorious over Junpei Aotsu in the tournament's first round but was then defeated by Yuji Takeuchi in the quarter-finals on April 30, 2011. Noiri floored Takeuchi in the second round and again at the beginning of the third when both men knocked each other down with concurrent left hooks. Takeuchi, knowing that he had to stop Noiri to win the fight, came back aggressively towards the end of the fight, however, and violently knocked Noiri out with a left hook to send him crashing out of the tournament.

Despite having recently suffering the first loss of his professional career, Noiri was invited to the K-1 World MAX 2011 -63kg Japan Tournament Final, a one-night tournament made up of eight of Japan's best lightweights, on June 25, 2011. He faced a tough test in the quarter-finals against the more experienced Ryuji Kajiwara. The bout was called a draw after three rounds and so an extension round was added to decide the winner, after which Noiri was given a close split decision. In the semis, he went up against the previous year's runner-up in Yuta Kubo and came out on the losing side of a unanimous decision.

He then returned to Krush to compete in the 2011 Under-22 ~63 kg Supernova~ Tournament. After finishing both Violence and Daizo Sasaki in the same night on October 10, 2011, Noiri advanced to the tournament's final stage held at Krush.14 on December 9, 2011. The semi-finals saw Noiri rematch Hiroya and cruise to a unanimous decision (30–27, 30–28, 30–28) after sending his opponent to the canvas in round one. In the final, he went up against Koya Urabe and ended the fight with one of the year's most impressive knockouts. After nullifying Urabe's superior boxing, he landed with a flying knee that ended Urabe's night towards the end of the first round, crowning him the tournament winner.

Noiri ended the year with a unanimous decision victory over Kengo Sonoda at Fight For Japan: Genki Desu Ka Omisoka 2011 on December 31, 2011. To kick off 2012, he bested his first international opponent, Frenchman Cedric Peynaud, with a unanimous decision (30–28, 29–28, 29–28) at Krush.17 on March 17, 2012.

On May 20, 2012, Noiri ventured up to 64 kg/141 lb limit to face Raz Sarkisjan at the Hoost Cup. The previously unknown Dutch-Armenian fighter scored a major upset with a unanimous decision win, flooring Noiri twice in the second round before getting dropped himself in the third. Three months later, Noiri returned to 63 kg/138 lb and bounced back with a unanimous points (30–27, 30–27, 30–28) win over Makihira Keita at Krush.22.

The end of 2012 saw lightweight's previous kingpin Yuta Kubo move up in weight, and so Noiri then took his place as number one in the world rankings. This despite his loss to Sarkisjan which took place at 64 kg/141 lb, technically outside the lightweight limit of 63.5 kg/140 lb.

He solidified his place as the world's top lightweight with a unanimous decision (30–28, 29–27, 29–28) win over Yetkin Ozkul at Krush.24 in Tokyo on November 10, 2012. After an even first two rounds, Noiri dropped Ozkul with a flying knee in the final round, securing a victory.

He dominated Makoto Nishiyama en route to a second round referee stoppage in a non-tournament bout at the Krush Grand Prix 2013 ~67kg First Class Tournament~ on January 14, 2013.

Moving up to the welterweight division, Noiri was invited to the Road to Glory Japan −65kg Slam on March 10, 2013 and had his rubber match with Hiroya in the quarter-finals. This fight was much closer than their first two affairs as Noiri was only able to pick up a majority decision due to a point deduction for low blows to Hiroya, resulting in scores of 30–29, 30–29 and 29–29. He struggled again in the semis, but came out with another majority decision over Yukihiro Komiya. In the tournament final, he was much more dominant as he floored Yuki twice in round one and twice again in two, forcing the referee to stop the bout.

This tournament win qualified him for the Glory 8: Tokyo - 2013 65kg Slam event on May 3, 2013, the tournament made up of the world's eight top 65 kg kickboxers. In the quarter-finals, he defeated Liam Harrison via TKO due to a cut in round two, and in the semis he outpointed Mosab Amrani. He faced fellow Japanese native Yuta Kubo in a rematch in the final. He suffered a brutal low blow in the first round and wasn't able to rally back until the third. It was too late by that time, however, and he lost the decision.

In his first match under Muay Thai rules, Noiri knocked out Seiji Takahashi with a third round front kick to the face for the vacant WBC Muaythai Japan Super Lightweight (−63.503 kg/140 lb) Championship at a New Japan Kickboxing Federation event on July 15, 2013.

Noiri had his rubber match with Yuta Kubo at Krush.32 in Nagoya on September 1, 2013, defeating Kubo for the first time in three attempts to take his Krush 67 kg/147 lb title and put an end to his seventeen fight win streak in the process. The bout was relatively one-sided in favour of Noiri and saw Kubo deducted a point in round three for extensive clinching, allowing Noiri to take a wide unanimous decision.

He challenged Tetsuya Yamato for his WBC Muaythai International Super Lightweight Championship at an NJKF event in Tokyo on February 16, 2014, losing a unanimous decision.

On March 22, 2020, Noiri defeated David Meija at K-1 K'Festa 3. Before the fight, the COVID-19 epidemic swept the globe. Masaaki Noiri says his camp was fortunately not affected by the virus.

He defeated Vitor Tofanelli  by unanimous decision on November 3, 2020. Noiri was scheduled to fight Yodkhunpon Sitmonchai at K-1: K’Festa 4, but the event was later postponed due to the COVID-19 pandemic. He was instead scheduled to fight Playchumphon Sor.Srisomphong at K-1 World GP 2021: K’Festa 4 Day.2. He won the fight by unanimous decision.

Noiri was scheduled to face Kona Kato in the quarterfinal bout of the K-1 welterweight World Grand Prix, held at K-1 World GP 2021: Yokohamatsuri on September 20, 2021. As Kato later withdrew due to COVID-19 related problems, Noiri was rescheduled to face FUMIYA. He won the tournament with stoppage victories against FUMIYA in the quarterfinals, Ali Ayinta in the semifinals, and Rukiya Anpo in the finals.

Noiri was scheduled to face Kona Kato at K-1: K'Festa 5 on April 3, 2022, in a non-title bout. He won the fight by second round knockout after scoring a knockdown in the previous round.

Noiri faced the former Shoot boxing Super Lightweight champion and the 2018 SHOOT BOXING S-Cup World Tournament winner Kaito Ono at The Match 2022 on June 19, 2022. He lost the fight by an extra round unanimous decision.

Noiri faced the 148-fight veteran Dzhabar Askerov at K-1 World GP 2023: K'Festa 6 on March 12, 2023. He won the fight by a first-round knockout.

Personal life
Outside of kickboxing, Masaaki Noiri likes to spend time with his kids, eat food, and play games.

Championships and awards

Karate
Japan Karate Judge Organization
2006 JKJO Karate-Do MAC Japan Cup Elementary School 3rd place
2007 JKJO All Japan Junior Championship Middle School -55kg Winner
Shin Karate
2009 Shin Karate All Japan K-2 Grand Prix Lightweight Champion

Kickboxing
Glory
2013 Road to Glory Japan 65 kg Tournament winner
2013 Glory −65kg Slam Tournament Runner-up
K-1
2021 K-1 Fighter of the Year
2021 K-1 World GP Japan −67.5kg Champion
2017 K-1 World GP Japan −65kg Champion
2009 K-1 Koshien King of Under 18 Tournament Champion
Krush
 2011 Krush Under-22 Supernova~ Tournament -63kg Champion
 2013 Krush −67 kg Champion
World Boxing Council Muaythai
WBC Muaythai Japan Super Lightweight (−63.503 kg/140 lb) Champion
La Nuit des Champions
2016 La Nuit des Champions 66 kg Champion
Awards
eFight.jp
2x Fighter of the Month (July 2013, September 2021)

Fight record

|- style="background:#cfc" 
| 2023-03-12 || Win ||align=left| Dzhabar Askerov  || K-1 World GP 2023: K'Festa 6 || Tokyo, Japan || KO (Right straight) || 1 || 2:00 ||48–11

|-  style="text-align:center; background:#fbb"
| 2022-06-19 || Loss||align=left| Kaito || THE MATCH 2022 || Tokyo, Japan || Ext.R Decision (Unanimous)|| 4 ||3:00||47–11
|- style="background:#cfc" 
| 2022-04-03 || Win ||align=left| Kona Kato || K-1: K'Festa 5 || Tokyo, Japan || KO (Uppercut) || 2 || 2:17 || 47–10
|-  style="background:#cfc;"
| 2021-09-20 || Win ||align=left| Rukiya Anpo || K-1 World GP 2021: Yokohamatsuri -67.5 kg Championship Tournament, Final || Yokohama, Japan || TKO (Three knockdowns) || 3 || 2:51 || 46–10
|-  
! style=background:white colspan=9 |
|-
|-  style="background:#cfc;"
| 2021-09-20 || Win ||align=left| Ayinta Ali || K-1 World GP 2021: Yokohamatsuri -67.5 kg Championship Tournament, Semi Final || Yokohama, Japan || TKO (Two knockdowns) || 1 || 1:32 || 45–10
|-  style="background:#cfc;"
| 2021-09-20 || Win ||align=left| FUMIYA || K-1 World GP 2021: Yokohamatsuri -67.5 kg Championship Tournament, Quarter Final || Yokohama, Japan || KO (Right hook) || 1 || 2:10 || 44–10
|-  style="background:#cfc;"
| 2021-03-28|| Win ||align=left| Playchumphon Sor.Srisomphong || K-1 World GP 2021: K’Festa 4 Day.2 || Yoyogi, Japan || Decision (Unanimous) || 3 || 3:00 || 43–10
|- style="background:#cfc;"
| 2020-11-03|| Win ||align=left| Vitor Toffanelli||  K-1 World GP 2020 in Fukuoka || Fukuoka, Japan || Decision (Unanimous)  || 3 ||3:00 || 42–10
|- style="background:#cfc;"
| 2020-03-22|| Win ||align=left| David Mejia ||  K-1 World GP 2020: K’Festa 3 || Saitama, Japan ||  Decision (Unanimous) ||3  ||3:00 || 41–10
|- style="background:#cfc;"
| 2019-12-28|| Win||align=left| Hasan Toy || K-1 World GP 2019 Japan: ～Women's Flyweight Championship Tournament～ || Nagoya, Japan || Decision (Majority) ||3  ||3:00 || 40–10 
|-
|-
|- style="background:#cfc;"
| 2019-08-24|| Win||align=left| Sami Lamiri || K-1 World GP 2019: Japan vs World 5 vs 5 & Special Superfight in Osaka || Osaka, Japan || KO (Body Punches) || 2 || 2:35|| 39–10
|-
|-
|- style="background:#Fbb;"
| 2019-03-10|| Loss ||align=left| Jordann Pikeur || K-1 World GP 2019: K’FESTA 2 || Saitama, Japan || Decision (Unanimous) || 3 || 3:00|| 38–10
|-
|- style="background:#cfc;"
| 2018-12-08|| Win || align=left|  Riki Matsuoka|| K-1 World GP 2018: K-1 Lightweight World's Strongest Tournament || Osaka, Japan || KO (Left Hook) || 1 || 1:55|| 38–9
|- style="background:#cfc;"
| 2018-08-18 || Win || align=left|  Yang Haodong || Krush 92 || Japan || KO (Left High Kick) || 1 || 2:59|| 37–9
|- style="background:#cfc;"
| 2018-06-17 || Win || align=left|  Vincent Foschiani|| K-1 World GP 2018: 2nd Featherweight Championship Tournament || Saitama, Japan || KO (Left Hook to the Body) || 2 || 2:45|| 36–9
|- style="background:#cfc;"
| 2018-03-21 || Win || align=left| Tetsuya Yamato || K-1 World GP 2018: K'FESTA.1 || Saitama, Japan || KO (Punches) || 3 || 2:55|| 35–9
|-  
! style=background:white colspan=9 |
|-
|- style="background:#Fbb;"
| 2017-11-25 || Loss ||align=left| Abdellah Ezbiri || Nuit Des Champions 2017 || Marseille, France || Decision (unanimous) || 5 || 3:00 || 34–9
|-
! style=background:white colspan=9 |
|-
|- style="background:#cfc;"
| 2017-08-20 || Win ||align=left| Diego Freitas  || Krush 79  || Japan || KO (Right High Kick) || 2 || 1:14 || 34–8
|- style="background:#cfc;"
| 2017-06-18 || Win || align=left| Kaew Fairtex || K-1 World GP 2017 Super Middleweight Championship Tournament || Tokyo, Japan || Ext. R. Decision (Split) || 4 || 3:00|| 33–8
|- 
! style=background:white colspan=9 |
|- style="background:#cfc;"
| 2017-02-25 || Win ||align=left| Younes Smaili || K-1 World GP 2017 – 62.5 kg World Tournament || Saitama, Japan || Decision (Unanimous) || 3 ||3:00  || 32–8
|- style="background:#cfc;"
| 2016-11-19 || Win ||align=left| Eddy Nait Slimani || Nuit Des Champions 2016 || Marseille, France || KO (Left Knee to The Body) || 3 ||2:57  || 31–8
|-
! style=background:white colspan=9 |
|-
|- style="background:#cfc;"
| 2016-08-20 || Win ||align=left| Wang Pengfei  || Krush 68 || Tokyo, Japan || KO (Left Middle Kick) || 1 || 1:37 || 30–8
|-  
|- style="background:#Fbb;"
| 2016-06-24 || Loss|| align=left| Kaew Fairtex || K-1 World GP 2016 -65kg World Tournament, Semi Finals || Tokyo, Japan || Decision (unanimous) || 3 || 3:00 || 29–8
|-
|- style="background:#cfc;"
| 2016-06-24 || Win ||align=left| Massaro Glunder  || K-1 World GP 2016 -65kg World Tournament, Quarter Finals || Tokyo, Japan || Decision (unanimous) || 3 || 3:00 || 29–7
|-
|- style="background:#Fbb;"
| 2016-03-04 || Loss ||align=left| Hideaki Yamazaki || K-1 World GP 2016 -65kg Japan Tournament, Final || Tokyo, Japan || Decision (majority) || 3 || 3:00 || 28–7
|-
! style=background:white colspan=9 |
|-
|- style="background:#cfc;"
| 2016-03-04 || Win ||align=left| Hiroya || K-1 World GP 2016 -65kg Japan Tournament, Semi Finals || Tokyo, Japan || Decision (majority) || 3 || 3:00 || 28–6
|-
|- style="background:#cfc;"
| 2016-03-04 || Win ||align=left| Minoru Kimura  || K-1 World GP 2016 -65kg Japan Tournament, Quarter Finals || Tokyo, Japan || KO (Jumping knee)|| 1 || 2:54 || 27–6
|-
|- style="background:#cfc;"
| 2015-11-21 || Win ||align=left| Yasuomi Soda || K-1 World GP 2015 The Championship || Tokyo, Japan || Decision (unanimous) || 3 || 3:00 || 26–6
|- style="background:#cfc;"
| 2015-08-22|| Win||align=left| Hideaki Yamazaki || Krush.57  in NAGOYA || Nagoya, Japan || Ext.R Decision(Unanimous) || 4 || 3:00 || 25-6
|-
|- style="background:#Fbb;"
| 2015-04-19 || Loss ||align=left| Massaro Glunder || K-1 World GP 2015 -55kg Championship Tournament || Tokyo, Japan || TKO (Doctor Stoppage) || 2 || 0:40 || 24–6
|-
|- style="background:#cfc;"
| 2015-02-06 || Win ||align=left| Ilias Bulaid|| Krush 51 || Tokyo, Japan || Decision (unanimous) || 3 || 3:00 || 24–5 
|-
|- style="background:#cfc;"
| 2014-12-21 || Win ||align=left| Atsushi Ogata || Krush 48 || Sendai, Japan || KO (Knee & punches)|| 1 ||  || 23–5
|-
|- style="background:#Fbb;"
| 2014-02-16 || Loss ||align=left| Tetsuya Yamato || NJKF || Tokyo, Japan || Decision (unanimous) || 5 || 3:00 || 22–5
|-
! style=background:white colspan=9 |
|-
|- style="background:#cfc;"
| 2013-09-01 || Win ||align=left| Yuta Kubo || Krush.32 || Nagoya, Japan || Decision (unanimous)|| 3 || 3:00 || 22–4
|-
! style=background:white colspan=9 |
|-
|- style="background:#cfc;"
| 2013-07-15 || Win ||align=left| Seiji Takahashi || NJKF || Tokyo, Japan || KO (right front kick) || 3 || 1:17  || 21–4
|-
! style=background:white colspan=9 |
|-
|- style="background:#Fbb;"
| 2013-05-03 || Loss ||align=left| Yuta Kubo || Glory 8: Tokyo – 65 kg Slam Tournament, Final || Tokyo, Japan || Decision (unanimous) || 3 || 3:00 || 20–4
|-
! style=background:white colspan=9 |
|-
|- style="background:#cfc;"
| 2013-05-03 || Win ||align=left| Mosab Amrani || Glory 8: Tokyo – 65 kg Slam Tournament, Semi Finals || Tokyo, Japan || Decision (unanimous) || 3 || 3:00 || 20–3
|-
|- style="background:#cfc;"
| 2013-05-03 || Win ||align=left| Liam Harrison || Glory 8: Tokyo – 65 kg Slam Tournament, Quarter Finals || Tokyo, Japan || TKO (cut) || 2 || || 19–3
|-
|- style="background:#cfc;"
| 2013-03-10 || Win ||align=left| Yuki || Road to Glory Japan 65 kg Tournament, Final || Tokyo, Japan || TKO (referee stoppage) || 2 || 1:35 || 18–3
|-
! style=background:white colspan=9 |
|-
|- style="background:#cfc;"
| 2013-03-10 || Win ||align=left| Yukihiro Komiya || Road to Glory Japan 65 kg Tournament, Semi Finals || Tokyo, Japan || Decision (majority) || 3 || 3:00 ||17–3
|-
|- style="background:#cfc;"
| 2013-03-10 || Win ||align=left| Hiroya || Road to Glory Japan 65 kg Tournament, Quarter Finals || Tokyo, Japan || Decision (majority) || 3 || 3:00 || 16–3
|-
|- style="background:#cfc;"
| 2013-01-14 || Win ||align=left| Makoto Nishiyama || Krush Grand Prix 2013 ~67 kg First Class Tournament~ || Tokyo, Japan || TKO (referee stoppage) || 2 || 1:56 || 15–3
|-
|- style="background:#cfc;"
| 2012-11-10 || Win ||align=left| Yetkin Ozkul || Krush.24 || Tokyo, Japan || Decision (unanimous) || 3 || 3:00 || 14–3
|-
|- style="background:#cfc;"
| 2012-08-26 || Win ||align=left| Makihira Keita || Krush.22 || Nagoya, Japan || Decision (unanimous) || 3 || 3:00 || 13–3
|-
|- style="background:#Fbb;"
| 2012-05-20 || Loss ||align=left| Raz Sarkisjan || Hoost Cup || Nagoya, Japan || Decision (unanimous) || 3 || 3:00 || 12–3
|-
|- style="background:#cfc;"
| 2012-03-17 || Win ||align=left| Cedric Peynaud || Krush.17 || Tokyo, Japan || Decision (unanimous) || 3 || 3:00 || 12–2
|-
|- style="background:#cfc;"
| 2011-12-31 || Win ||align=left| Kengo Sonoda || Fight For Japan: Genki Desu Ka Omisoka 2011 || Saitama, Japan || Decision (unanimous) || 3 || 3:00 || 11–2
|-
|- style="background:#cfc;"
| 2011-12-09 || Win ||align=left| Koya Urabe || Krush.14, 2011 Under-22 ~63 kg Supernova~ Tournament Final || Tokyo, Japan || KO (left flying knee) || 1 || 2:58 || 10–2
|-
! style=background:white colspan=9 |
|-
|- style="background:#cfc;"
| 2011-12-09 || Win ||align=left| Hiroya || Krush.14, 2011 Under-22 ~63 kg Supernova~ Tournament Semi Finals || Tokyo, Japan || Decision (unanimous) || 3 || 3:00 || 9–2
|-
|- style="background:#cfc;"
| 2011-10-10 || Win ||align=left| Daizo Sasaki || Krush 2011 Under-22 ~63 kg Supernova~ Tournament, Quarter Finals || Tokyo, Japan || KO (left hook to the body) || 2 || 1:42 || 8–2
|-
|- style="background:#cfc;"
| 2011-10-10 || Win ||align=left| Ranbo || Krush 2011 Under-22 ~63 kg Supernova~ Tournament, First Round|| Tokyo, Japan || KO (right knee) || 3 || 1:25 || 7–2
|-
|- style="background:#Fbb;"
| 2011-06-25 || Loss ||align=left| Yuta Kubo || K-1 World MAX 2011 -63kg Japan Tournament Final, Semi Finals || Tokyo, Japan || Decision (unanimous) || 3 || 3:00 || 6–2
|-
|- style="background:#cfc;"
| 2011-06-25 || Win ||align=left| Ryuji Kajiwara || K-1 World MAX 2011 -63kg Japan Tournament Final, Quarter Finals || Tokyo, Japan || Extension round decision (split) || 4 || 3:00 || 6–1
|-
|- style="background:#Fbb;"
| 2011-04-30 || Loss ||align=left| Yuji Takeuchi || Krush First Generation King Tournament, Quarter Finals || Tokyo, Japan || KO (left hook) || 3 || 1:51 || 5–1
|-
|- style="background:#cfc;"
| 2010-12-12 || Win ||align=left| Junpei Aotsu || Krush First Generation King Tournament, First Round || Tokyo, Japan || Decision (unanimous) || 3 || 3:00 || 5–0
|-
|- style="background:#cfc;"
| 2010-09-20 || Win ||align=left| Hirotaka Urabe || Krush.10 || Tokyo, Japan || Decision (unanimous) || 3 || 3:00 || 4–0
|-
|- style="background:#cfc;"
| 2010-06-12 || Win ||align=left| Yoshihiro Shirakami || Krush-EX ~ Next Generation Fight 2010 vol.2 ~ || Tokyo, Japan || KO (left straight to the body) || 3 || 2:37 || 3–0
|-
|- style="background:#cfc;"
| 2010-04-29 || Win ||align=left| Sol de Tigre Yosuke || Krush.6 || Tokyo, Japan || KO (right flying knee) || 2 || 1:29 || 2–0
|-
|- style="background:#cfc;"
| 2010-03-14 || Win ||align=left| Shinji Aseishi || Nagoya Kick: Central Rhythm || Nagoya, Japan || Decision (unanimous) || 3 || 3:00 || 1–0
|-

|-
|- bgcolor="#FFBBBB"
| 2010-11-20 || Loss ||align=left| Keigo Ishida || K-1 Koshien 2010 King of Under 18 Final, Quarter Finals || Tokyo, Japan || Decision (unanimous) || 1 || 2:00
|-
|- bgcolor="#CCFFCC"
| 2010-11-20 || Win ||align=left| Naoki Takeda || K-1 Koshien 2010 King of Under 18 Final, First Round || Tokyo, Japan || Decision (unanimous) || 1 || 2:00
|-
|- bgcolor="#CCFFCC"
| 2009-12-31 || Win ||align=left| Shota Shimada || Dynamite!! 2009, K-1 Koshien 2009 King of Under 18, Final || Saitama, Japan || Decision (unanimous) || 3 || 2:00
|-
! style=background:white colspan=9 |
|-
|- bgcolor="#CCFFCC"
| 2009-12-31 || Win ||align=left| Hiroya || Dynamite!! 2009, K-1 Koshien 2009 King of Under 18, Semi Finals || Saitama, Japan || Decision (unanimous) || 3 || 2:00
|-
|- bgcolor="#CCFFCC"
| 2009-10-26 || Win ||align=left| Keisuke Miyamoto || K-1 World MAX 2009 World Championship Tournament Final, K-1 Koshien 2009 King of Under 18, Quarter Finals || Yokohama, Japan || Decision (unanimous) || 3 || 2:00
|-
|- bgcolor="#CCFFCC"
| 2009-08-10 || Win ||align=left| Ryo Murakoshi || K-1 Koshien 2009 King of Under 18 Round of 16|| Japan || KO (right knee) || 3 || 0:59
|-
|- bgcolor="#CCFFCC"
| 2009-07-04 || Win ||align=left| Yamato Kojima|| K-1 Koshien 2009 King of Under 18 Round of 32 || Chubu, Japan || Decision( Unanimous) || 3 || 2:00
|- bgcolor="#CCFFCC"
| 2008-12-06 || Win||align=left| Takeno Ren || Fighting Road Cup Double Impact || Tokyo, Japan || Decision (Unanimous) || 3 || 2:00
|-
|- bgcolor="#c5d2ea"
| 2008-07-13 || Draw||align=left| Sakai Raku || HEAT 7 "New Age Fight" || Tokyo, Japan ||Decision (Unanimous) || 2 || 2:00
|-
|- bgcolor="#c5d2ea"
| 2007-12-22 || Draw||align=left| Daizo Sasaki || Team Dragon sponsored "Burning Dragon! Part 1" Amateur Challenge Match || Tokyo, Japan ||Decision (Unanimous) || 1 || 3:00
|-
|- bgcolor="#CCFFCC"
| 2007-10-28 || Win||align=left| Tomokazu Hiroiki || 6th BRIDGE one match challenge || Tokyo, Japan || KO ||  || 
|-
|-
| colspan=9 | Legend:

References

External links
 Official Krush profile

Living people
1993 births
Japanese male kickboxers
Lightweight kickboxers
Welterweight kickboxers
Japanese male karateka
Sportspeople from Nagoya